June 2013

See also

References

 06
June 2013 events in the United States